Nicole Greene (born May 2, 1997) is an American athlete who competes in the high jump.

Personal life
She was born in Boston, Massachusetts as the daughter of Trevor and Deborah Price. She has one brother, Christopher.
She was educated at Episcopal School in Jacksonville and Ponte Vedra High School before going on to the University of North Carolina. Greene competed at the US trials in 2021 whilst studying for the Medical College Admission Test. Both her parents are also medical doctors.

Career
Greene was a track athlete until her middle school coach encouraged her to focus on jumping events.

The 2018 NCAA indoor champion and 2019 NCAA outdoor runner-up, she won the NACAC U23 Championships in Querétaro in July 2019 with a jump of 1.87m.
In August 2019 she finished 8th in the Pan American Games, held in Lima.

At the 2016 IAAF World U20 Championships in Bydgoszcz she finished fifth in the high jump competition.

Greene finished third at the 2020 U.S. Olympic Trials with a personal best jump of 1.93m. It was the joint-28th highest jump in the world by a woman in 2021. Greene was runner-up to Vashti Cunningham at the 2022 USA Indoor Track and Field Championships held in Spokane, Washington.

References

External links
 
 North Carolina Tar Heels bio

Living people
1997 births
American female high jumpers
North Carolina Tar Heels women's track and field athletes
Athletes (track and field) at the 2019 Pan American Games
Track and field athletes from Boston
Pan American Games competitors for the United States